The 10th & Oregon Crew, or 10th & O Gang, is a predominantly Italian American gang and organized crime group operating in Philadelphia, Pennsylvania. Active since the 1960s, the gang is associated closely with but independent from the Italian-American Philadelphia crime family. It is primarily active in South Philadelphia and certain working-class Italian-American neighborhoods in nearby South Jersey.

Criminal activities
Conducting drug trafficking, gambling, extortion and loan sharking rackets, the 10th & Oregon Crew operates from a series of taverns, bars, restaurants and social clubs in South Philadelphia. Under different leadership, the group has both been allied closely with and violently feuded against the Philadelphia crime family at different times. In particular, the gang has established relations with the Philadelphia Mafia's Narducci Crew.

History
Founded in the 1960s, the gang's name stems from a street corner that intersects 10th Street and Oregon Avenue. An early leader of the 10th & Oregon Crew was Rocco Turra, a South Philadelphia career criminal and Teamsters enforcer. Rocco Turra was acquitted along with future Philadelphia crime family caporegime Joseph "Chickie" Ciancaglini, Sr. of the August 1967 murder of Robert DeGeorge.

In 1995, Louis Turrà – the leader of the 10th & Oregon Crew, overseeing the gang's marijuana, cocaine and heroin dealing and sports betting enterprise – was severely beaten and robbed of his Rolex watch at an after-hours club by associates of Philadelphia crime family boss Joey Merlino, allegedly for failing to pay a Mafia street tax on the gang's illegal earnings. Angered by the beating, Turra sought vengeance. His father Anthony Turra hosted a meeting at his house during which Anthony, Louis and the gang discussed killing Merlino. The plot failed to materialize as both Turras were indicted in August 1997, along with thirteen others. In addition to drug charges, the gang was charged with the murder of one suspected informant and the attempted murder of another, and as well as conspiring to kill Merlino. While awaiting trial, Louis Turra apparently hanged himself (though there is speculation that he was in fact murdered by the Mafia) in the Metropolitan Correctional Center in Manhattan on January 7, 1998. On March 18, 1998, Anthony Turra – terminally ill with cancer and reliant on a wheelchair – was shot to death outside his home by a gunman in a black ski mask as he left for the federal courthouse, where a jury was deliberating in the racketeering and drug case against him and four other men. "We consider this an organized crime assassination, a mob hit," Police Inspector Jerrold Kane said. Most of the others indicted were convicted of racketeering. Three years later, Merlino was put on trial for helping orchestrate Anthony Turra's murder, but was acquitted.

A dispute between the 10th & Oregon Crew and the Pagan's Motorcycle Club over drug dealing and loan sharking turf began in the late 1990s. On February 28, 1999, Pagans bikers beat five 10th & O Crew members at a bar owned by Eugene "Genie Boy" Miller, who had taken over the remnants of the organization after Louis Turra's death. Miller was beaten, pistol-whipped and shot in the leg and buttocks. Joey Merlino attempted to broker a peace treaty between the two warring gangs and hosted a sit-down in the spring of 1999, which Pagans president Steve "Gorilla" Mondevergine and leading 10th & O Gang member John "Johnny the Hat" Hendri both attended. However, no agreement was reached, and on August 29, 1999, Mondevergine survived being shot eight times at close range as he walked to his mother's house after leaving a bar. He refused to identify his attacker to police. On November 3, 2000, Mondevergine opened fire on Hendri as he left a diner, firing twice and missing both times. Mondevergine was arrested near the scene of the shooting in possession of a firearm later that day by police and Federal Bureau of Investigation (FBI) agents conducting surveillance in the area. He was imprisoned for racketeering in January 2001 and served a three-year sentence.

Tenth & Oregon Crew member Nicodemo "Nicky Slick" DiPietro was convicted of first-degree murder and sentenced to life in prison in connection with the February 28, 2000, shooting death of Tad Rice-Green.

Following further conflicts with the Philly Mafia and the Pagans, 10th & Oregon Crew leaders temporarily relocated to nearby Deptford Township in South Jersey before later returning to South Philadelphia. In June 2002, three Philadelphia crime family associates were reportedly beaten and knocked unconscious by 10th & O Crew members after a verbal disagreement at a local South Philadelphia bar.

Andrew Micali, a former member of the 10th & O Crew who had left the gang following a dispute with leaders Johnny Garbarino and Eugene "Genie Boy" Miller, was sentenced to five years in state prison on February 27, 2009, for his role in running a sports bookmaking network with the Philadelphia crime family that operated inside the Borgata Hotel Casino poker room in Atlantic City. The gambling ring was dismantled in November 2007 following Operation High Roller, an investigation led by the State Police and the Division of Criminal Justice which involved the assistance of eleven other law enforcement agencies in New Jersey and Pennsylvania.

See also
History of the Italian Americans in Philadelphia
East Harlem Purple Gang
South Brooklyn Boys
Tanglewood Boys

References

Italian-American organized crime groups
Italian-American culture in Philadelphia
Gangs in Philadelphia
Gangs in New Jersey
American Mafia gangs